The worst...album in the world...ever...EVER! is the first album from Shirehorses, a spoof English band. The title is a dig at the long-running series of compilation albums popular in the UK.

The album was released on 3 November 1997, and reached number 22 on the UK Albums Chart.

Track listing 
THE SHIREHORSES — "(Now) I Know (Where I'm Going) Our Kid" (The Seahorses — "Love is the Law")
PEELA TATER — "Ta La" (Kula Shaker — "Tattva")
BABY BLOKE — "You're Gormless" (Baby Bird — "You're Gorgeous")
THE CHARLEY TWINS — "West Country Boy" (The Charlatans — "North Country Boy", and briefly Reef — "Place Your Hands")
DICK CAVE AND THE BAD CHEESE feat. RILEY MINOGUE — "Hapless Boy Lard" (Nick Cave and The Bad Seeds featuring Kylie Minogue — "Where the Wild Roses Grow")
DOOFERGRASS - "Feel Like Shite" (Supergrass — "Alright")
GAZEBO - "Lardy Boy" (Placebo — "Nancy Boy")
EDWYN BOBBINS — "Girl Like You (Hiya)" (Edwyn Collins — "A Girl Like You")
FLUSH — "Single Bloke" (Lush — "Single Girl")
MORONICO — "Sha La La La, Tum Tee Tum (Untitled)" (Monaco — "What Do You Want from Me?")
CHEEPER — "Ugly Bleeder" (Sleeper — "Inbetweener")
DICK CAVE AND THE BAD CHEESE feat. ALAN BAWL (NO RELATION) — "The Ballad of Franny Lee" (Nick Cave and The Bad Seeds — "Henry Lee")
THE RA-GNOMES — "Sheena Easton (Punk Rocker) / Joe's Fucked Off" (The Ramones — "Sheena Is a Punk Rocker" segued with "Blitzkrieg Bop")
ALLADIN-ANE — "Bill Oddity" (David Bowie (aka Aladdin Sane) — "Space Oddity")
FRANK SPENCER BLUES EXPLOSION — "Frank Spencer Blues Explosion" (Jon Spencer Blues Explosion general parody)
PO-FASIS — "Cum On Skweeze Me Boilz" (Oasis, covering Slade's "Cum On Feel the Noize")
BABY BLOKE — "You're a Bastard" (Baby Bird — "You're Gorgeous")

References 

1997 debut albums
Musical parodies
Shirehorses albums
1990s comedy albums
Columbia Records albums